Spell – Dolce mattatoio is a 1977 Italian film directed by Alberto Cavallone.

Release
Spell was distributed in Italy by Stefano Film on 20 May 1977 as Spell – Dolce mattatoio. After a short run in Italy, it was released as L'uomo, la donna e la bestia to capitalize on the popularity of Walerian Borowczyk's La Bête. Cavallone commented on the re-titling of the film as "very irritating" and that the re-release was "definitely a shitty title."

Reception
In contemporary reviews, Leonardo Autera of Corriere della Sera stated that the film was "redundant, clunky, and amateurishly acted and ultimately, lacking any semblance of style"

See also
 List of Italian films of 1977

References

Footnotes

Sources

External links
 

1977 films
1977 drama films
1970s Italian-language films
Italian drama films
Incest in film
1970s Italian films